Hindaun is one of the 200 Legislative Assembly constituencies of Rajasthan state in India. It is in Karauli district and is reserved for candidates belonging to the Scheduled Castes. It is a part of the Karauli-Dholpur (Lok Sabha constituency).

The constituency covers all voters from Hindaun tehsil.

Members of the Legislative Assembly

Election results

2018

See also
List of constituencies of the Rajasthan Legislative Assembly
 Hindaun City
Karauli District
Educational institutions in Hindaun Subdivision

References

Karauli district
Assembly constituencies of Rajasthan